Talent Mukwanda (born 24 April 1993) is a Zimbabwean footballer who plays as a midfielder for Herentals Queens FC and the Zimbabwe women's national team.

Club career
Mukwanda played for Herentals in Zimbabwe.

International career
Mukwanda capped for Zimbabwe at senior level during two COSAFA Women's Championship editions (2020 and 2021).

References

1993 births
Living people
Zimbabwean women's footballers
Women's association football midfielders
Zimbabwe women's international footballers